Wiley Mayne (January 19, 1917 – May 27, 2007) was a four-term Republican United States Congressman from Iowa's 6th congressional district. He was one of several Republican members of the House Judiciary Committee who were defeated in the fall of 1974 after he voted against resolutions to impeach President Richard M. Nixon in the summer of 1974.

Personal life 
Mayne was born in Sanborn, Iowa in 1917. After attending public school in Iowa, Mayne studied at Harvard College, where he received his B.S. and then continued on to Harvard Law School. In 1939, he received his J.D. from the University of Iowa College of Law. He joined the Federal Bureau of Investigation in 1941, the same year that he was admitted to practice law. After a three-year tour of duty with the United States Naval Reserve as a Lieutenant Junior Grade from 1941–1943, Mayne returned to private practice, joining a Sioux City, Iowa law firm. In 1963, he served a one-year term as president of the Iowa Bar Association. Afterwards, he chaired the Grievance Commission of the Iowa Supreme Court until 1966.

On January 5, 1942, Mayne married Betty Dodson. The couple had three children; sons Wiley Mayne II and John Mayne, both of whom followed in their father's footsteps and became lawyers, and daughter Martha Mayne Smith.

Congressional Terms 
In 1966, Mayne ran for Congress in the now-obsolete Sixth Congressional District in Northwest Iowa and defeated Democratic freshman incumbent Stanley L. Greigg. Mayne was elected four times to the House, where he served on the House Agriculture Committee and the House Judiciary Committee. While serving on the House Agriculture Committee, a major issue of the era was a sudden and swift decline in the United States cattle market. In 1973, he was made a delegate to the Food and Agriculture Organization in Rome. One of Mayne's Congressional aides was future actor and congressman Fred Grandy.
 
As a member of the House Judiciary Committee, Mayne played an influential role in amendments to the Federal Rules of Evidence, especially those involving the admissibility of opinion testimony. His political downfall, however, came in his fourth term during his service on that Committee, when Mayne was one of ten Republican Committee members to vote against articles of impeachment against President Richard Nixon arising from the Watergate scandal. At the time of his Committee votes, Mayne believed that the proof was not sufficient to necessitate a call for impeachment. In Nixon's final days in office, however, Mayne's opinion quickly changed after evidence implicating Nixon in a subsequent coverup was made public, and he vowed to vote in favor of impeachment when the articles came before the full House. The damage, however, had been done, and Mayne narrowly lost the 1974 election to his 1972 opponent, Democrat Berkley Bedell.

Later life 
After leaving Congress, Mayne returned to Sioux City, Iowa to resume his law practice. His wife, Betty, died in 2001, and Mayne continued to practice law until 2005. Mayne died in May 2007 after suffering a cardiopulmonary incident.

References

1917 births
2007 deaths
Deaths from pulmonary embolism
Politicians from Sioux City, Iowa
United States Navy personnel of World War II
United States Navy officers
Federal Bureau of Investigation agents
Harvard Law School alumni
University of Iowa College of Law alumni
Iowa lawyers
Republican Party members of the United States House of Representatives from Iowa
People from Sanborn, Iowa
Watergate scandal investigators
20th-century American politicians
Harvard College alumni